Total Drama (often shortened as TD) is a Canadian animated television series created by Jennifer Pertsch and Tom McGillis that premiered on Teletoon in Canada on July 8, 2007, and on Cartoon Network in the U.S. on June 5, 2008. The series is both a homage and satire of common conventions from reality television competition shows like Survivor.

Each season revolves around a group of teenagers competing in an elimination-style competition, in that the contestants compete in challenges both as teams and individually for rewards and immunity from elimination. The teams merge roughly halfway through the competition. As the contestants develop relationships with each other, they are progressively eliminated from the game. When there are only two contestants left, they compete in a final challenge where the winner is awarded a cash prize (C$100,000 (US$73,129.00) in the first season, C$1,000,000 (US$731,485.00) from the second season and onward). The series currently consists of five seasons (Island, Action, World Tour,  Revenge of the Island, and the two-part All-Stars and Pahkitew Island).

Total Drama has developed a cult following and spawned a franchise. A spin-off series, Total Drama Presents: The Ridonculous Race premiered on September 7, 2015. A second spin-off series, Total DramaRama, premiered on September 1, 2018 in the U.S., and on October 7, 2018, in Canada.

On February 17, 2021, it was announced that a revival of Total Drama had been greenlit, with two new seasons being produced for Cartoon Network and HBO Max in the United States, and CBBC in the United Kingdom.

Production
Total Drama was developed and produced by Fresh TV, in participation with Teletoon, Cartoon Network, and the British Broadcasting Corporation (BBC), and distributed by Cake Entertainment. The series was funded in part by the Canada Media Fund (formerly the Canadian Television Fund), and the Canadian Film or Video Production Tax Credit. The first season was funded by Xenophile Media, Bell Broadcast and New Media Fund. The series, primarily targeted at tweens and teenagers, was animated at Elliott Animation and directed by Todd Kauffman and Mark Thornton of Neptoon Studios. The creators, Tom McGillis and Jennifer Pertsch, studied what teenagers liked and disliked about reality television shows in the writing process.

McGillis says they used a "countrywide online research project" to determine this demographic's likes. Fresh TV partners McGillis, Pertsch, Elliott and Irving produced the series. The budget for the first season was US$8,000,000. It was animated in Flash, at Elliott Animation's studio in Toronto.

Every cast and crew member on Total Drama had to sign a confidentiality agreement not to disclose who the winner was. All the characters were designed by Kauffman. An early name for the series was Camp TV when the series first started production in 2006.

The fifth season was divided into two different segments. The first segment, Total Drama All-Stars, takes place on the original island from the first season, Camp Wawanakwa,  while the second segment, Total Drama: Pahkitew Island, features a new setting and cast.

McGillis had stated in 2013 that his personal goal was for Total Drama to go up to ten seasons. Alex Ganetakos, the executive story editor and the senior writer for the series, also mentioned in 2014 that the production team planned to make more seasons in the future.

In a Q&A on September 25, 2018, when asked if there would be additional seasons, McGillis responded with "Nope. Sorry to be a dreamkiller, but there's no market for this experience in the wider entertainment marketplace right now".

On February 17, 2021, it was announced that two new seasons were being produced for Cartoon Network and HBO Max, On June 22, 2022, it was announced by Cake Entertainment that the BBC had joined Warner Bros. Discovery as a co-commissioner for the new seasons and would air them on the CBBC Channel in the United Kingdom. In addition, the previous five seasons of the show and its spin-offs would be added to BBC iPlayer.

On October 6, 2022, Regular Capital posted a tweet revealing a new poster for Total Drama that showed the new cast and Chef in a new design.

On October 27, 2022, it was confirmed in an interview with Terry McGurrin on YouTube that Deven Mack would replace Clé Bennett as the voice of Chef Hatchet, and reprising his role from the spin-off series Total DramaRama.

Episodes

This is a list of all the seasons that have aired with the original Canadian air dates shown below along with basic elements for each season. The 100th episode aired on February 27, 2014.

Broadcast
Total Drama first premiered in Canada on July 8, 2007, on Teletoon, while the United States aired the series almost a year later on Cartoon Network on June 5, 2008. Since then, Total Drama has become an international franchise and one of the biggest successes for Fresh TV. As of September 2011, the entire series has been shown in over 100 countries around the world, with the first season airing in 188 countries worldwide. The fourth season first aired on Canal+ Family (later on Télétoon+) in France, while the fifth season first aired on K2 in Italy. Australia was also the first country to air the third season. Total Drama also aired on Pop Max (formerly known as Kix) in the United Kingdom, before its upcoming season moving to CBBC.

Characters

Total Drama has had a total of 52 characters in the series who were introduced as contestants through five seasons. The first three seasons consist of an original cast, with a total of 26 characters (23 are introduced in the first season (if you count Mr. Coconut), while the other three are introduced in the second season's special before becoming main characters in the third season), while the fourth season consists of a new cast with 13 new characters. However, the fifth season brings back 7 contestants from both casts (and Feral  Ezekiel appears) each to compete together for the million. Then a third cast with 14 new characters gets introduced. For the Ridonculous Race, 36 new characters were introduced as the fourth cast. For the new season, there were 16 revealed contestants.

 

By season, 23 characters competed in the first season, 15 competed in the second season, 18 competed in the third season, 13 competed in the fourth season, 14 characters competed in both the fifth and sixth season (28 characters in total for both seasons) and 36 competed in the seventh.

Voice actors
There are various voice actors who have recorded the voices for all the characters in the Total Drama series. Both Christian Potenza and Clé Bennett voice the two main characters in the series, who appear in almost every episode. Christian Potenza plays the role of egotistical and unempathetic host Chris McLean, saying that the best part of the job was that his character could not be voted off the show. Clé Bennett voices Chef Hatchet, who serves as McLean's assistant. Other voice actors include Brian Froud, who voices contestants Harold and Sam and is the only other voice actor who has the main role in every season. Emilie-Claire Barlow and Rachel Wilson play the contestant Courtney on Total Drama and Emilie-Claire Barlow stated that Courtney was her favorite character that she had ever played.

A list of all the voice actors for the original cast: Emilie-Claire Barlow as Courtney, Clé Bennett as DJ, Julia Chantrey as Eva, Carla Collins as Blaineley, Katie Crown as Izzy, Novie Edwards as Leshawna, Megan Fahlenbock as Gwen, Kristin Fairlie as Bridgette, Brian Froud as Harold, Sarah Gadon as Beth, Marco Grazzini as Alejandro (for Total Drama World Tour), Carter Hayden as Noah, Alex House as Alejandro (for Total Drama All-Stars), Lauren Lipson as Sadie, Scott McCord as both Owen and Trent, Stephanie Anne Mills as both Katie and Lindsay, Drew Nelson as Duncan, Annick Obonsawin as Sierra, Peter Oldring as Cody, Ezekiel, and Tyler, Dan Petronijevic as Geoff, Adam Reid as Justin, and Rachel Wilson as Heather.

For the second-generation cast, the voice actors are: Carleigh Beverly as Dakota, Jon Cor as Brick, Cory Doran as Mike, Kevin Duhaney as Cameron, Laurie Elliot as Jo, Brian Froud as Sam, Athena Karkanis as Anne Maria, Barbara Mamabolo as Zoey, Caitlynne Medrek as Dawn, Ashley Peters as Staci, Tyrone Savage as Lightning, and James Wallis as Scott.

For the third-generation cast, the voice actors are: Clé Bennett as Beardo and Leonard, Zachary Bennett as Shawn, Katie Bergin as Jasmine, Daniel DeSanto as Dave, Bruce Dow as Max, Kristi Friday as Scarlett, Christopher Jacot as Topher, Bryn McAuley as Amy and Samey, Sunday Muse as Ella, Sarah Podemski as Sky, Ian Ronningen as Rodney, and Rochelle Wilson as Sugar.

Most voice actors have only voiced one character, while some actors have voiced two characters. Peter Oldring and Clé Bennett are the only two voice actors who have voiced more than two characters, Oldring voicing three and Bennett voicing four (five if counting DJ's mother). However, if the spin-offs are to be included, then multiple voice actors would have voiced multiple characters throughout the series. Brian Froud and Bennett are the only voice actors to voice contestants from more than one generation. Emilie Claire-Barlow revealed that Courtney was originally voiced by an unnamed voice actress, later revealed to be Rachel Wilson (who also voiced Heather) as the first voice of Courtney in the first two episodes of Total Drama Island before the role was later given to her. Alejandro is the only character to have three voice actors; he was voiced by Marco Grazinni in Total Drama World Tour, Keith Oliver while he was in his robot suit, and Alex House in Total Drama All-Stars. Josh is the only minor character to have a voice actor of his own, Dwayne Hill, as these roles are usually given to one of the main cast members.

Roles outside series
Total Drama characters are seen in an entirely different series called Skatoony where the characters are interviewed to play in quiz trivia games against real people and other Canadian series characters. Geoff, Leonard, Noah, and Owen also appear in Total Drama Presents: The Ridonculous Race as contestants. Beth, Bridgette, Cody, Courtney, DJ, Duncan, Ella, Geoff, Gwen, Harold, Izzy, Katie, Leshawna, Lightning, Max, Noah, Owen, Sadie, Sugar and Trent appear in the alternate-universe spin-off Total DramaRama as young children, along with Alejandro, Carrie, Chef Hatchet, Chet, Chris McLean, Don, Heather, Jasmine, Jen, Laurie, MacArthur and Tom appearing as adults.

Reception

Broadcast
The series has received high ratings on Teletoon and Cartoon Network, ranking #1 in the under-14 age group throughout its run. As of 2011, the first season has been shown in over 188 countries, while the rest of the series has been seen in at least 100.

Critical reception

The first season, Island, received generally positive reviews. Common Sense Media gave the show 4 out of 5 stars, calling it a "clever cartoon reality show spoof". 

The second season, Action, received mostly mixed reviews from critics, who criticized the overt similarity to the previous season, but praised the development of characters who had less time in Island and the challenges.

The third season, World Tour, received critical acclaim for the antagonist of the season in Alejandro, the musical numbers and humour, with minor criticism directed at Ezekiel's development and the Gwen-Courtney-Duncan love triangle.

The fourth season, Revenge of the Island, was criticized for a shorter length and a weaker cast than previous seasons and received mixed to positive reviews.

The first part of the fifth season, All-Stars, was heavily criticized for its character derailment, challenges, main antagonist, and lack of payoff. The second part, Pahkitew Island, was criticized for its more stereotyped cast and was considered even worse than All-Stars.

Legacy
Total Drama has garnered a cult following. Various online communities see fans discuss about the series, and it has inspired fanfiction. Series creator Tom McGillis commented on the series popularity, saying that "For tweens around the world, Total Drama is more than just a parody of a reality show. It's THEIR reality show". Even gathering the attention of YouTubers, most prominently Reaction YouTubers, Such as Berleezy, Jayempee Reacts and TheReactionKing.

Awards

Media

DVD releases

Up until November 2, 2011, only Total Drama Island had been released on DVD. Cartoon Network released their Total Drama Island DVD in the U.S. on August 18, 2009 (Region 1), while Madman Entertainment (Region 4) also released Total Drama Island on DVD in Australia, but this time in two parts (Collection 1 on May 5, 2010, and Collection 2 on September 29, 2010). However, almost two years after Total Drama Action was first aired, Madman released their Collection 1 DVD of the second season on November 2, 2011 (with Collection 2 being released on July 4, 2012), making Australia the only country that has released the entirety of Total Drama Action for private home viewing. Australia also released Total Drama World Tour on DVD with Collection 1 being released on April 3, 2013, and Collection 2 being released on August 7, 2013. On October 8, 2014, Total Drama: Revenge of the Island was released into one part due to it being a shorter season. The first part of the fifth season, Total Drama All-Stars was released on March 4, 2015, with the second part, Total Drama: Pahkitew Island being released on July 7, 2015.

Online promotion
Teletoon hosted a Total Drama-based website called "Total Drama Online" from 2009 to 2013 where players could play games and earn badges to win prizes. Even though most features (like user accounts, original avatar designer and badge counter) from this website were only exclusive to Canadian viewers, all of the games and basic elements were available to the rest of the world. Cartoon Network also had their own Total Drama website from 2009 to 2015, which was very similar to the Canadian website, but was only exclusive to American viewers. Various alternate websites based on the series also exist throughout most of the other countries the show airs in, which are all in their respective languages.

Spin-off series

The Ridonculous Race 

A spin-off series titled Total Drama Presents: The Ridonculous Race takes place in the same universe as the original show. The series is modeled on the format of The Amazing Race where the cast is split into multiple teams of two (referred to as duos) which race around the world throughout the series. There is a new host named Don, who replaced the original host Chris. Even though a few of the characters from the main series make appearances, the spin-off series is primarily dominated by a new cast. The spin-off series is a "buddy comedy" and includes 18 pairs of teams (36 characters). It first premiered on September 7, 2015, on Cartoon Network and later premiered on January 4, 2016, on the Canadian version of Cartoon Network.

Total DramaRama 

A second spin-off series was announced on December 19, 2017, as Total Drama Daycare. The series was later renamed Total DramaRama so that viewers would not mistake it for a daycare season of Total Drama. It first premiered on September 1, 2018 on Cartoon Network in the U.S. and on October 7, 2018 on Teletoon in Canada. The series has a runtime length of eleven minutes, and is a slice of life comedy. It features some of the original characters from Total Drama Island as toddlers such as Beth, Bridgette, Cody, Courtney, Duncan, Gwen, Harold, Izzy, Leshawna, Noah and Owen, as well as Jude from 6teen. Chef Hatchet also returns as a younger adult. The series began production in early 2017.

On February 13, 2019, the series was greenlit for a second season.

On June 23, 2020, Corus Entertainment announced that the series was renewed for a third season, which was set to premiere in mid-2021. Revenge of the Island contestant, Lightning, and Pahkitew Island contestant, Sugar, were aged down to join the cast.

See also

 6teen
 Grojband
 Stoked
 Detentionaire
 Drawn Together

References

External links

Canadian Official Total Drama Site Teletoon
Total Drama Producers Blog Blogspot
Season 1 Page Cake Entertainment
Season 2 Page Cake Entertainment
Season 3 Page Cake Entertainment
Season 4 Page Cake Entertainment
Season 5 Page (Part 1) Cake Entertainment
Season 5 Page (Part 2) Cake Entertainment

 
2000s Canadian animated television series
2000s Canadian comedy-drama television series
2000s Canadian reality television series
2000s Canadian satirical television series
2010s Canadian animated television series
2010s Canadian comedy-drama television series
2010s Canadian reality television series
2010s Canadian satirical television series
2007 Canadian television series debuts
Canadian children's animated comedy television series
Canadian adult animated drama television series
Canadian children's animated drama television series
Canadian children's reality television series
Canadian flash animated television series
Canadian television series revived after cancellation
English-language television shows
Television series by Fresh TV
Reality television series parodies
Reality television series franchises
Self-reflexive television
Teen animated television series
Teletoon original programming
Cartoon Network original programming
Television shows filmed in Toronto